Allama Matthews is a former professional American football player who played wide receiver for the Atlanta Falcons.

Early in his Vanderbilt career, coaches tried Matthews at safety and receiver. Once all parties settled on tight end, Matthews put together one of the finest receiving campaigns ever, helping spark the team’s run to the Hall of Fame Bowl. In 1982, Matthews was named first-team All-America by Football News after posting 61 receptions for 797 yards and 14 TDs, most ever by a Commodore. Later that season, Matthews was also named SEC Offensive Lineman of the Year by the Atlanta Touchdown Club. Matthews also earned First-team All-SEC honors by the Associated Press and United Press International in 1982. He concluded his Vanderbilt career with 18 touchdowns.

References

1961 births
American football wide receivers
Atlanta Falcons players
Vanderbilt Commodores football players
Living people